Wine Dark Sea is the sixth solo album of American musician Jolie Holland. The album was released on May 20, 2014 through ANTI- records.

Track listing 
 "On and On" - 3:56
 "First Sign of Spring" - 4:52
 "Dark Days" - 5:17
 "Route 30" - 4:50
 "I thought It Was the Moon" - 4:01
 "The Love You Save" - 5:13
 "All the Love" - 4:10
 "Saint Dymphna" - 6:14
 "Palm Wine Drunkard" - 6:06
 "Out on the Wine Dark Sea - 5:51
 "Waiting for the Sun - 5:59

Personnel 
 Jolie Holland – Producer, bandleader, mixing, voice, piano, whistle,  violin, guitar
 Adam Brisbin - guitar
 Indigo Street - guitar
 Doug Weiselman - guitar, bass guitar, reeds
 Geoffrey Muller - bass guitar
Justin Veloso -drums
Dan Rieser -drums
Douglas Jenkins -Cello, Engineer, Mixing, Producer
Larry Crane - 	Mixing
Joe Tex - Composer
Chanticleer Tru - Guest Artist, Vocals
Garrett Haines - Mastering

References

External links 
 

2014 albums
Jolie Holland albums